The 2003 WNBA Season was the Women's National Basketball Association's seventh season. It was first season in which teams either folded or relocated, as well as the first to have teams that were not co-owned with NBA teams. The Orlando Miracle relocated to Connecticut and became the Connecticut Sun, the Utah Starzz relocated to San Antonio, Texas and became the San Antonio Silver Stars. Meanwhile, both the Miami Sol and the Portland Fire folded, while the Charlotte Sting became the second WNBA team without a brother NBA team.  The schedule increased from 32 games per team to 34, where it stands to this day.  The season ended with the Detroit Shock winning their first WNBA Championship.

Regular season standings
Eastern Conference

Western Conference

Season award winners

Playoffs

Coaches

Eastern Conference
Charlotte Sting: Trudi Lacey
Cleveland Rockers: Dan Hughes
Connecticut Sun: Mike Thibault
Detroit Shock: Bill Laimbeer
Indiana Fever: Nell Fortner
New York Liberty: Richie Adubato
Washington Mystics: Marianne Stanley

Western Conference
Houston Comets: Van Chancellor
Los Angeles Sparks: Michael Cooper
Minnesota Lynx: Suzie McConnell Serio
Phoenix Mercury: John Shumate
Sacramento Monarchs: Maura McHugh and John Whisenant
San Antonio Silver Stars: Candi Harvey and Shell Dailey
Seattle Storm: Anne Donovan

External links
2003 WNBA Final Standings
2003 WNBA Awards
2003 WNBA Playoffs

 
Women's National Basketball Association seasons
2003 in American women's basketball
2002–03 in American basketball by league
2003–04 in American basketball by league